Kubachi may refer to:
Kubachi language, a language spoken in the Republic of Dagestan, Russia
Kubachi (urban-type settlement), an urban locality (an urban-type settlement) in the Republic of Dagestan, Russia
Kubachi ware, a style of Persian pottery